Below are the list of squads who participated in the 2005 CONCACAF Gold Cup.

Group A

Colombia
Head coach:  Reinaldo Rueda

Honduras
Head coach:  José de la Paz Herrera

Panama
Head coach:  José Hernández

Trinidad and Tobago
Head coach:  Leo Beenhakker

Group B

Canada
Head coach:  Frank Yallop

Costa Rica
Head coach:  Alexandre Guimarães

Cuba
Head coach:  Luis Armelio García

Yaikel Perez defected to the United States

Maykel Galindo defected to the United States

United States
Head coach:  Bruce Arena

Group C

Guatemala
Head coach:  Ramón Maradiaga

Jamaica
Head coach:  Wendell Downswell

Mexico
Head coach:  Ricardo La Volpe

South Africa
Head coach:  Stuart Baxter

Player representation

By club

By club nationality
Nations in bold are represented by their national teams in the tournament.

The above table is the same when it comes to league representation, with only the following exception:
The English league has 15 players with the inclusion of two players coming from Wales-based Wrexham.

External links

CONCACAF Gold Cup squads
squads